Typical System is the second full-length album by Australian post-punk band Total Control. Produced by band member Mikey Young, the album was released on 24 June 2014 by Iron Lung Records. It peaked at No. 5 on the ARIA Hitseekers Albums chart.

At the Music Victoria Awards of 2014, the album was nominated for Best Album.

Reception

Typical System received generally positive reviews from music critics. At Metacritic, which assigns a normalised rating out of 100 to reviews from mainstream critics, the album received an average score of 83, which indicates "universal acclaim", based on 11 reviews.

Accolades

Track listing

CD (TCON102), vinyl (LUNGS053)

References

Total Control (band) albums
2014 albums